The 79th Indianapolis 500 was held at the Indianapolis Motor Speedway in Speedway, Indiana on Sunday, May 28, 1995. Sanctioned by USAC, it was part of the 1995 CART PPG Indy Car World Series season. Jacques Villeneuve won in his second start. After dominating the 1994 race and the 1994 IndyCar season, Marlboro Team Penske failed to qualify for the race. Two-time and defending Indy 500 winner Al Unser Jr. and two-time winner Emerson Fittipaldi (bumped) could not get their cars up to speed. A noticeable period of decline followed for the team until 2000 when Gil de Ferran won the CART championship, and subsequently the team returned to Indianapolis in 2001.

On lap 190, with the field coming back to green on a restart, leader Scott Goodyear passed the pace car in turn four, and was assessed a stop-and-go penalty. Goodyear refused to serve the penalty, claiming that the green light was on, and stayed out on the track. Per the black flag rules, officials stopped scoring Goodyear on lap 195, which handed Jacques Villeneuve the lead of the race, and ultimately, a controversial victory. Examination of video evidence after the race proved that Goodyear passed the pace car while the yellow light was on, and his team declined to protest the ruling. Villeneuve's winning car was powered by the Ford Cosworth XB engine, the powerplant's first Indy victory in its fourth attempt. The win broke a seven-year winning streak by Ilmor-constructed engines. With Goodyear's disqualification, Honda was effectively denied their first Indy victory, and did not win at Indianapolis until 2004 with Buddy Rice.

Race winner Jacques Villeneuve's day was not without incident, as he was penalized two laps for inadvertently passing the pace car during a caution period in the early segment of the race. Through both strategy and luck, the young driver made up the deficit during the course of the race, earning the "Indy 505" sobriquet. In addition to the race controversies, the day was marred by a multi-car crash on the opening lap involving Stan Fox, Eddie Cheever, and others. Fox suffered career-ending head injuries.

The race was held under a growing cloud of uncertainty about the future of the sport of open wheel racing in the United States. Since the early 1980s, the sport had operated in relative harmony, with an arrangement such that CART sanctioned the season-long Indy car national championship, and USAC sanctioned the Indy 500 singly. The Speedway's management, led by Tony George, had already announced the formation of the rival Indy Racing League for 1996, and the Indy 500 was to be its centerpiece. Competitors, fans, and media alike, were apprehensive about the event's future beyond 1995. The 1995 race was the final Indy 500 that featured a field of CART-based drivers and teams.

Due to injuries, retirements, and the open wheel split months later, the race was the final Indy 500 for several drivers, including Bobby Rahal, Danny Sullivan (career ending injury in Michigan in 1995), Teo Fabi, Scott Pruett, and Stefan Johansson. Emerson Fittipaldi (who failed to qualify but suffered career ending injuries in the second Michigan race in 1996) never raced at Indy again.

The 1995 month of May celebrated the 50th anniversary of Hulman/George family ownership of the Speedway.

Race schedule

Background

Rule changes
Team Penske dominated the 1994 race with the 209-cid Mercedes-Benz 500I purpose-built pushrod engine. Fearing an unfair advantage, and the possibility of escalating costs, both USAC and CART separately evaluated the situation. Two weeks after the 1994 race, USAC announced that for 1995, the 209 cid purpose-built pushrod engines were allowed 52 inHG of "boost" (down from 55 inHG). The traditional "stock block" production-based engines (e.g., Buick & Menard) were still allowed 55 inHG. Meanwhile, the mainstay overhead cam 2.65L V-8 engines stayed at 45 inHG.

During the summer of 1994, Tony George announced his plans to start the Indy Racing League in 1996, with an emphasis on cost-saving measures. On August 11, 1994, USAC changed its decision, and scaled back the boost for the purpose-built pushrod engines further to 48 inches; and outlawing it outright for 1996. The move was considered by Roger Penske as "politically motivated," and ultimately set back the Penske Team going into 1995.

Marlboro Team Penske won 12 (of 16) races in 1994, including five 1-2-3 finishes, and swept the top 3 in the final 1994 CART championship points standings. As the 1995 season started, Penske drivers Al Unser Jr. and Emerson Fittipaldi each won a race prior to Indy. Despite the outward appearance that the team was still at the top of their game entering Indianapolis, insiders at the team were growing apprehensive, and were concerned that they were ill-prepared. A private test yielded poor results related to the chassis handling, and it was becoming increasingly apparent that the team had lost considerable ground after losing the use of the Mercedes-Benz 500I.

Other changes for 1995 included the heralded return of Firestone tires, which had last competed in 1974, and an updated Honda V-8 engine.

Team and driver changes
Rahal-Hogan Racing dropped the Honda program, and instead, Tasman Motorsports became the prominent team involved. Honda introduced a new engine for the 1995 race, the aluminum alloy block HRH V-8, replacing the older iron block HRX V-8. After a one-year sabbatical (spending time in broadcasting and in NASCAR), Danny Sullivan returned to Indy for PacWest Racing. Michael Andretti, after one year at Ganassi, returned to his familiar spot at Newman/Haas, alongside Paul Tracy, who moved over to that team from Penske.

A re-booted Patrick Racing arrived at Indy with driver Scott Pruett. During the previous year, the team had served as a non-competing factory test outfit for Firestone.

Davy Jones announced plans to attempt "Double Duty." He qualified at Indy, but ultimately failed to make the field at Charlotte.

Practice – week 1

Saturday May 6
Opening day saw the Menard cars of Arie Luyendyk (233.281 mph) and Scott Brayton (232.408 mph) lead the speed chart for the day.

Sunday May 7
Menard cars once again were the top 2, with Luyendyk (232.715 mph) best of the day. Penske drivers Emerson Fittipaldi and defending Indy 500 winner Al Unser Jr. took their first practice laps of the month, but neither were among the top ten.

Monday May 8
Arie Luyendyk posted the fastest practice lap in Indy history, 234.107 mph. With Scott Brayton second, Paul Tracy also was over 230 mph.

Tuesday May 9
Scott Brayton finally bumped Luyendyk off the top spot, with a lap of 231.410 mph for the day. Teo Fabi (230.716 mph) became the fourth driver over 230 mph for the month.

Wednesday 10
Rain delayed the start of practice until shortly after 1:30 p.m. Arie Luyendyk again led the speed charts at 232.468 mph.

At 3:31 p.m., Davey Hamilton crashed in turn four, suffering a broken ankle. The brief practice session was ended around 4 p.m. due to rain.

Thursday May 11
Arie Luyendyk upped the fastest practice lap in Indy history to 234.322 mph. Scott Brayton later bettered the time with a lap of 234.656 mph. Eight drivers were over 230 mph for the day.

Friday, May 12
At 5:12 p.m., Jacques Villeneuve went high in turn 2 and crashed into the outside wall. The car was heavily damaged, but Villeneuve was not seriously injured.

Arie Luyendyk set yet another unofficial track record, with a practice lap of 234.913 mph. The top nine drivers were all over 231 mph.

Time trials – weekend 1

Pole day – Saturday May 13
Rain delayed the start of time trials until late in the afternoon. At 4:45 p.m., pole day qualifying began. Arie Luyendyk in a Menard entry, took the provisional pole at 231.031 mph. A tight schedule saw several cars take runs, including Eddie Cheever (226.314 mph) and Paul Tracy (225.795 mph)

At 5:16 p.m., Scott Brayton, also driving for Menard, secured the pole position with a run of 231.604 mph. Before the close of the day, Michael Andretti (229.294 mph) tentatively squeezed his way onto the front row.

When the 6 o'clock gun sounded, 11 cars were in the field, and several drivers were still in the qualifying line. Pole day qualifying would be extended into the next day.

Pole Day conclusion & Second day – Sunday May 14
A windy but warm day was observed for the second day of time trials. Pole qualifying continued from the previous day. Several cars qualified, with Jacques Villeneuve leading the early cars at 228.397 mph.

At 1:07 p.m., Scott Goodyear (230.759 mph) qualified his Honda-powered machine for the third starting position, bumping Michael Andretti to the second row. At 1:12 p.m., the original pole day qualifying order was exhausted, and Scott Brayton was officially awarded the pole position. Among the cars who had not qualified included Rahal-Hogan drivers Bobby Rahal & Raul Boesel. Neither Penske entry (Emerson Fittipaldi & Al Unser Jr.) made an attempt in the pole round.

Second day qualifying started at just before 1:30 p.m. Among the quicker runs were Hideshi Matsuda, Bobby Rahal and Raul Boesel. Buddy Lazier joined the two previous Menard entries and put a third team car in the field. At the close of the second day of time trials, the field was filled to 25 cars (8 vacant). After continuing problems getting up to speed, neither Penske entry attempted to qualify all weekend.

Practice – week 2

Monday May 15
Team Menard cars took their first day off since the Speedway opened for the month. Paul Tracy (228.339 mph) led the speed chart for the day. The fastest non-qualified car was Éric Bachelart at 227.261 mph.

At Team Penske, Emerson Fittipaldi wheeled out a year-old Penske chassis and practiced for 59 laps, with a top lap of 220.745 mph.

Tuesday May 16
Rain kept the track closed until 2:11 p.m. Team Penske borrowed a Reynard chassis from Roberto Guerrero's team, and Al Unser Jr. took his first laps in the car. In 44 laps, Unser posted a top lap of 218.050 mph.

At 4:45 p.m., Bryan Herta spun and crashed hard in turn 2. The car became slightly airborne, and Herta momentarily lost consciousness. Herta was diagnosed with a minor concussion, and was sidelined for several days.

Teo Fabi (226.998 mph) posted the fastest lap of the day.

Wednesday May 17
Rain closed the track for the day.

Off the track, Rahal-Hogan Racing announced that they would supply Marlboro Team Penske with back-up Lola chassis, in a goodwill effort to help Penske's drivers get up to speed. A year earlier, Penske had loaned chassis to Rahal's team, when they were struggling to qualify the 1994 Honda-powered machines.

Thursday May 18
Driving the newly acquired Lola, Emerson Fittipaldi was quickly up to 223.775 mph. Al Unser Jr., however, remained in the Penske chassis, and was mired back at only 218.510 mph.

The practice session was brief, as rain kept the track closed until 2 p.m. Green flag conditions only lasted 53 minutes, and the track closed for rain at 3:21 p.m.

Friday May 19
The final full day of practice saw heavy action. Adrian Fernandez (228.397 mph) led the speed chart for the non-qualified cars. The attention of the afternoon was focused again on Team Penske, as they were making their final efforts to get their cars up to speed.

Emerson Fittipaldi driving the Rahal back-up car, quickly began to find speed, and within 10 minutes, was over 226 mph. At 11:26 a.m., Fittipaldi turned a lap of 227.814 mph, his fastest lap of the month, and the fastest lap by that car all month.

Al Unser Jr., however, was still trying to salvage speed out of the Penske car. After several inconsistent times throughout the day, his best lap of 219.085 mph was completed with five minutes left in the session. That night, Rahal offered a second chassis to Penske for Unser Jr. to drive.

Time trials – weekend 2

Third Day – Saturday May 20
At 5 p.m., Al Unser Jr. made his first attempt to qualify in a Rahal back-up car. Unser had practiced just minutes earlier at over 227 mph. After two laps in the 224 mph range, the run was waved off.

Scott Sharp, in a Foyt backup also waved off his first attempt. At 5:14 p.m., Emerson Fittipaldi made his first attempt in a Rahal backup car. His third lap was up to 226.097 mph, but the crew waved off the run. The move angered Fittipaldi, and proved unwise, as the speed would have been fast enough to qualify.

Most cars failed to complete their attempts, as conditions were unfavorable for speeds. Al Unser Jr. returned to the track for his second attempt at 5:46 p.m. This run, however, slower, and even more inconsistent, and the team waved it off as well.

Franck Fréon completed a slow run of 224.432 mph, and tentatively placed himself as slowest in the field. Scott Sharp made one last attempt as time expired, but the crew again waved off the run.

The day ended with the field filled to 30 cars. Both Penske cars, along with Sharp, were still not qualified.

Bump Day – Sunday May 21
With only three positions remaining, bump day began with both Penske drivers struggling to get their cars up to speed. At noon, Carlos Guerrero completed a run of 225.831 mph, and filled the field to 31 cars. Davy Jones waved off a run, and the early qualifiers were through.

Over the next four hours, the Penske team practiced, in a futile search for speed. Fittipaldi completed one lap at 228.017 mph, while Unser Jr. managed only 222.206 all afternoon.

At 5:07 p.m., qualifying resumed. Scott Sharp completed a run of 225.711 mph, slightly faster than his waved off run a day before. With only one position open, Emerson Fittipaldi took to the track. It was his second attempt to qualify. His four-lap run of 224.907 mph put him 32nd-fastest, and filled the field to 33 cars. Minutes later, Davy Jones completed a run of 225.135 mph, and bumped out Franck Fréon. The move put Fittipaldi on the bubble.

After surviving two attempts, Fittipaldi still clung to the 33rd starting position at 5:30 p.m. His teammate Al Unser Jr. then took to the track in his third and final attempt. He faced the grim possibility of missing the field, or bumping out his teammate to make the field. Unser's first lap of 221.992 mph drastically pulled down his average, and his speed was too slow to bump out Fittipaldi.

Fittipaldi survived three more attempts, and with 12 minutes left in the day, Stefan Johansson took to the track. Johansson's speed of 225.547 mph bumped out Fittipaldi. The Penske team had three cars left in the qualifying line, but none had a realistic chance of bumping their way in, or even making it to the front of the line. As the 6 o'clock gun sounded, Fittipaldi and Unser Jr., the winners of the previous three Indy 500s, were out of time, and had failed to qualify. It was the first time since 1968 that Penske Racing had failed to qualify a single car in the Indianapolis 500. 

Post-race Roger Penske quoted, "I've got to take the responsibility for not getting into the race, but a lot of my fellow team owners came up to me and offered me help and I want to thank them for that from the bottom of my heart. We are not going to buy our way into this race. We had an opportunity to compete on a level playing field and we did not get the job done."

Starting grid

Note: Bryan Herta crashed his already-qualified primary car during practice. He started the race in a back-up car; the car was moved to the 33rd starting position on race day.

Alternates
First alternate: Emerson Fittipaldi (#9T) – Bumped; Fittipaldi was not listed as the first alternate driver. On race day, Fittipaldi would announce the race for Brazilian television network Sistema Brasileiro de Televisao alongside Teo José and Dede Gomez.
Second alternate: Franck Fréon (#92) – Bumped

Failed to qualify

 = Former Indianapolis 500 Winner,  = Indianapolis 500 Rookie

Race recap

Start and Stan Fox accident
Rain fell the night before the race, and moisture continued throughout the early morning hours. The rain stopped, however, and the track was dried. The start of the race was delayed by only about five minutes.

At the start, Scott Goodyear swept into the lead from the outside of the front row. Seconds later, Stan Fox dipped low to the inside, hit the rumble strips, became loose and spun a half turn. The car shot directly into the outside wall in turn one. The car was demolished, the front nose was ripped off, and Fox's legs and body were exposed as the car crashed up into the catch fence. Eddie Cheever, Lyn St. James, and Carlos Guerrero were caught up in the accident. Gil de Ferran ran over a piece of debris, breaking the front suspension. He limped back to the pits, but dropped out when it was determined the damage was too much to repair. A long caution was needed for cleanup, and Fox was critically injured with a closed head injury due to g-forces. Despite his exposed extremities, however, he suffered no major injuries to his arms or legs. Fox was transported to Methodist Hospital, and after several months, he recovered, but would never race again.

On lap 10, the race finally got restarted. Arie Luyendyk got the jump on the green flag, and took the lead.

Jacques Villeneuve penalty
On lap 37, Arie Luyendyk was trying to get by the car of Scott Sharp. Luyendyk felt that Sharp was blocking him, and as they went into turn 1, Luyendyk gave him the finger. In the process, he knocked off his helmet headrest cushion. It flew out of the cockpit and landed on the racing surface. It brought out the yellow flag for debris. The yellow came out during a sequence of green-flag pit stops, the field was hectically shuffling in and out of the pit area.

By rule, the pits were immediately closed at the onset of yellow, and Jacques Villeneuve became scored as the leader on lap 38. A few cars, including Villeneuve, Scott Pruett and others, had not made their scheduled pit stop yet, and were getting precariously close to running out of fuel. Villeneuve was not aware he was actually leading the pack. The pace car came out to pick up the field, and by rule, was supposed to get directly in front of Villeneuve as the leader. But Villeneuve went by the pace car twice, not knowing they were trying to pick him up. Finally, the officials sorted out the field, the pit area was opened, and Villeneuve immediately went to the pits for service. He suffered a slow stop with several errors. He nearly pulled away with the fuel hose attached, then subsequently stalled as he pulled away.

A few minutes after the race went back to green, USAC assessed Jacques Villeneuve a two-lap penalty for passing the pace car twice as they were trying to pick him up. The penalty dropped him from 3rd place to 27th. The two laps were effectively deleted from his scoring serial.

Remainder of the first half
Michael Andretti led 45 laps in the first half but on lap 77, he was abruptly knocked out of the race. Maurício Gugelmin was leading in turn four, and Andretti was behind him in second place. Andretti caught him in turn four, as Gugelmin was slowing down to make a pit stop. Andretti tried to go around him on the outside, but got up into the "marbles" and brushed the wall exiting turn four, damaging the suspension. He veered across the track to enter the pits, to have the crew look over the car. The rear wishbone suspension was bent, and Andretti climbed out of the car, out of the race.

As Andretti was climbing from his car, Scott Sharp spun and wrecked in turn four.

By the time the field went back to green on lap 84, Jacques Villeneuve had made up one of his laps. He was running 20th, one lap down.

Second half
On lap 124, Andre Ribeiro stalled on the track with an electrical problem. By that time, Jacques Villeneuve had gotten his lap back, and was now on the lead lap in 12th place. Villeneuve caught another break when Paul Tracy slowed on the backstretch with electrical problems, bringing out another caution. 

Maurício Gugelmin led the most laps (59) but did not manage to lead again after lap 138. The leaders were now Jimmy Vasser, Scott Pruett, and Scott Goodyear. Jacques Villeneuve was now up to 6th place. After Vasser pitted while leading on lap 157, Villeneuve retook the lead for the first time since his penalty. 

On lap 162, Davy Jones crashed in turn 2 as Villeneuve was preparing to pit. The race restarted on lap 169. Vasser led following pit stops by most of the drivers during the caution. A lap later, Scott Pruett passed him going down the backstretch for the lead. Vasser got high and hit the outside wall in the north chute. Pruett held point until shortly after the restart on lap 176 when Goodyear passed him. 

By this stage of the race, the winds began to gust over 30 mph. On lap 184, with Goodyear still in front by almost a second, Pruett got high in turn 2 and bounced off the outside wall. Pruett’s car spun across the backstretch, got airborne and backed into the catchfence, demolishing the rear end.

Scott Goodyear penalty and finish
With eleven laps to go, Scott Goodyear led Jacques Villeneuve, Eliseo Salazar and Christian Fittipaldi under caution. The field prepared to go back to green on lap 190. Down the backstretch, Goodyear held back a little bit and allowed the pace car to clear ahead. United States Auto Club (USAC) official Don Bailey was driving the Corvette pace car, which was entering turn four. At the entrance of turn three, Goodyear and Villeneuve both accelerated, leaving a trail of tire marks behind. Villeneuve was right on his tail. Entering turn four, Goodyear continued to accelerate, but Villeneuve suddenly backed off to avoid passing the pace car. The two cars had caught up to the pace car in the middle of turn four, and it had not yet entered the pits. Scott Goodyear did not lift, blew by the pace car and proceeded to race down the front stretch. The rest of the field checked up and a gaggle of six cars nearly collided to avoid the pace car as it pulled into the pits.

USAC flagman Duane Sweeney put out the green flag, with Goodyear now well ahead of the rest of the cars. Villeneuve emerged from the melee still in second, and the rest of the field diced down the front stretch and funneled into turn one without incident.

A few moments later, USAC race control announced that Scott Goodyear was being assessed a stop-and-go penalty for passing the pace car on the restart. Goodyear was in disbelief on his radio, insisting that he did not do anything wrong. He claimed that the green light was on, and many felt the pace car was going too slow. The black flag was waved at Goodyear but he kept racing and chose not to acknowledge it. Team owner Steve Horne told Goodyear to keep going to the end believing they could protest the penalty after the race. Per the black flag rules, Goodyear had a window of five laps to serve the penalty before disqualification.

Since he failed to heed the penalty, USAC ceased scoring Goodyear after lap 195. Therefore, when Jacques Villeneuve came around to complete lap 196, he was scored officially in the lead, with Christian Fittipaldi second and Bobby Rahal now third. Villeneuve led the rest of the way to win the race. On the last lap, Arie Luyendyk passed Villeneuve at the stripe to un-lap himself, and finished 7th on the lead lap. With his lap total stopped at 195 for ignoring the penalty, Goodyear sank through the standings to 15th place, five laps down.

Pole-sitter Scott Brayton's day ended ten laps down in 17th place. His car was down on turbocharger boost, and after the race he quipped that he was so slow he felt he "was in the way." Years later, it would be revealed that Brayton (and his teammate Arie Luyendyk), were secretly being penalized by USAC for illegally over-boosting their turbocharger plenums and tampering with the pop-off valves during practice and qualifying.

Scott Goodyear was visibly upset in an interview as he said to reporters: "Disbelief is the best word to describe how I feel. I feel like I won this race. The pace car was going too slow. ... I almost hit it. Scott Pruett almost hit it, Villeneuve almost hit it. He wasn't on the gas and I saw the green lights turn on and that meant go. That's all I can say. I stayed out because in my eyes it was perfect ... and if I came in and later found I didn't make a mistake then what are you going to do? It would have been too late and you won't get it back."

Aftermath and legacy
The finish was highly controversial, with Scott Goodyear passing the pace car emerging as the story of the race. Goodyear claimed that he saw the green light on when he blew by the pace car, and the team threatened to protest. Video footage, however, was found that showed the yellow light was still on when it happened.

In addition, scoring transponders in the pace car and the race cars showed the following:
At the end of the backstretch, the pace car, turning its lights off, was clocked at 77 mph. Goodyear was slightly slower at 68 mph.
At the entry of turn three, where the pace car had been clocked at 83 mph, Goodyear and Villeneuve flew by at 117 mph and 118 mph respectively.
Through the north chute, Goodyear increased his speed to about 166 mph. The pace car was in the middle of turn 4.
By the exit of turn four, Goodyear blew by the pace car going about 193 mph. The pace car was speeding up from about 98 mph to over 117 mph as it entered the pits. Villeneuve, anticipating the situation, quickly slowed back down to about 142 mph.

After video and timing and scoring evidence came out that was not supportive of Goodyear's case, the team (Tasman Motorsports) decided not to file a protest. Goodyear stated that he stayed out (and did not serve the stop-and-go penalty) because if he was in the right, and stayed out, he could still be scored as the winner. If he came in, he would have lost the theoretical lead, and would have had no chance of claiming victory. In such case, he most likely would have finished 7th, the last car on the lead lap (except for Luyendyk, who un-lapped himself on the final lap).

Largely overlooked was Bobby Rahal's charge from 21st starting position to 3rd – the second year in a row he greatly improved on his starting position (in 1994, he started 28th and finished 3rd). It was also the first time in an odd year that Rahal finished the race. From 1982–1994, Rahal had a notable "odd-even/good-bad" streak at Indy. In even years, he had good finishes, and in odd years, his results were poor. Rahal's result was also accomplished in spite of a pit lane speeding penalty assessed during the race, a penalty that Rahal disputed in his post race television interview, as his car's on board speedometer had said that he was traveling 91 mph, safely under the 100 mph speed limit; Rahal called the penalty 'balderdash'. This would end up being his final Indy 500 as a driver. He returned to Indy seven years later as an owner in 2002.

Arie Luyendyk's pass of Jacques Villeneuve at the start-finish line was noteworthy as it allowed him to complete the full 500 miles, becoming the second and final driver to complete 500 miles in a Buick/Menard powered car.  Luyendyk's 7th-place finish was the second-highest for the Buick/Menard V6, surpassed only by the third-place finish of Al Unser, Sr. in 1992.

Jacques Villeneuve went on to win the 1995 CART championship, and subsequently signed with Williams in the offseason. With a growing cloud of controversy and uncertainty over a potential and looming open wheel "split," the 1995 Indianapolis 500 marked a turning point in the sport. Within months, and by the 1996 race, the landscape and organizational harmony of Indy car racing would change drastically. Villeneuve was the first, and as of 2022, is still the only Canadian to win the Indy 500.

Al Unser Jr., who notably failed to qualify, would like others, not be able to return to the 500 for several years, due mostly to the upcoming open wheel "split." The devastating result helped exacerbate an existing downward spiral that was involving his personal life. Unser Jr. returned to the Speedway for the first time in August of 1998, and competed in the inaugural IROC at Indy, finishing a close second to Mark Martin. He attended a practice session for the 1999 Indy 500, and was warmly welcomed by fans. For 2000, he switched full-time to the IRL, and finally got a chance to avenge his 1995 failure.

Results

CART Points standings after the race

 Note: Only the top five positions are included for the standings.

Broadcasting

Radio
The race was carried live on the IMS Radio Network. Bob Jenkins served as chief announcer for the sixth year. Johnny Rutherford served as "driver expert."

Brian Hammons and Chris McClure departed, which shuffled the assignments slightly. Newcomer Ken Double took the turn two location, and Mike King debuted as a pit reporter. Gary Lee shifted to the pits, and Chris Economaki joined the booth to offer commentary and observations during the pre-race, near the halfway point, and in the post-race.

This would be the final 500 on the broadcast for Bob Forbes, Larry Henry, and Sally Larvick.

Television
The race was carried live flag-to-flag coverage in the United States on ABC Sports. Paul Page served as host and play-by-play announcer. Bobby Unser (turn 2) and Sam Posey (booth) served as color commentators. Danny Sullivan left the broadcast and returned to the cockpit for the 1995 race.

For the first time since going to a live broadcast, the telecast was billed as a presentation of ABC's Wide World of Sports.

With the exception of Sullivan, the on-air crew remained the same for the sixth straight year (from 1990–1995). This would be the final 500, however, for Sam Posey as he would leave ABC after the IndyCar season to join SpeedVision for their Formula One coverage. After failing to qualify for the race, Emerson Fittipaldi served as an analyst for the race coverage on Brazilian television SBT.

Gallery

See also
 1995 Indianapolis 500 Radio Broadcast, Indianapolis Motor Speedway Radio Network

Notes

References

Works cited
1995 Indianapolis 500 Day-By-Day Trackside Report for the Media
Indianapolis 500 History: Race & All-Time Stats – Official Site
Month of Mayhem

Indianapolis 500 races
Indianapolis 500, 1995
Indianapolis 500
Indianapolis 500
Indianapolis 500
Indianapolis 500, 1995